David Imonitie (born 10 April 1954) is a Nigerian former professional tennis player.

Born in Lagos, Imonitie was employed by Nigeria's national sports commission and was sponsored on tour by the government. His best performance came at the 1979 Lagos Open, where he had wins over Greg Halder and Peter Elter to make the singles quarter-finals. He reached the second qualifying round of the 1979 Wimbledon Championships.

Imonitie played collegiate tennis for the Northwest Missouri State Bearcats. He was a two-time All-American and won four MIAA conference singles titles. After graduating he completed a master's degree at Arizona State University.

It was until 1986 that he got the opportunity to play in the Davis Cup and he featured in two ties.

References

External links
 
 
 

1954 births
Living people
Nigerian male tennis players
Sportspeople from Lagos
Northwest Missouri State Bearcats athletes
College men's tennis players in the United States